ESG (Electronic System and Logistics Group) is a limited liability company (GmbH) founded in 1967 in Munich. The company is headquartered in Germany and the United States. It employs over 1800 people.  The company offers professional services primarily in the Automotive, Aviation, Logistics, and Military sectors.

History 
In 1967 AEG-Telefunken, Rohde & Schwarz, SEL (Standard Elektrik Lorenz) and Siemens established the ESG Elektronik-System-Gesellschaft. In 1992, after a merger with FEG Flug-Elektronik-Gesellschaft, the consolidated company was named ESG Elektroniksystem- und Logistik-GmbH.

Offices 
 Germany : Berlin, Bonn, Cologne, Fürstenfeldbruck, Hamburg, Ingolstadt, Koblenz, Weißenthurm, Munich, Raunheim, Stuttgart, Wolfsburg
 USA : Starke, Florida

Subsidiaries 
 ESG Aerosystems Inc. (100%)
 ESG Consulting GmbH  (100%)
 CYOSS GmbH           (100%)
 ServiceXpert GmbH    (100%)

References

Avionics companies
Defence companies of Germany
Companies based in Munich
Electronics companies established in 1967
Technology companies established in 1967
1967 establishments in West Germany